KXAP-LD, virtual channel 14 (UHF digital channel 15), is a low-powered Estrella TV-affiliated television station licensed to Tulsa, Oklahoma, United States. The station is owned by the Teletul Media Group. KXAP maintains studio facilities located on East 2nd Street and Peoria Avenue (just off of Interstate 244) in downtown Tulsa, and its transmitter is located between South 103rd Avenue and the Mingo Valley Expressway/U.S. 169 in southeast Tulsa. On cable, the station is available on Cox Communications digital channel 444.

History
The original application for the UHF channel 51 license was filed to the Federal Communications Commission (FCC) on September 15, 1998 under the callsign K51FR; the FCC granted an application on July 5, 2000 to have the station's callsign changed to KOPE-LP.

On July 8, 2008, the station launched as a Spanish independent station under the callsign KXAP-LP; the station signed on with the intent to run locally produced programs for half of its daily schedule. The station also began carrying two local newscasts each weekday, an hour-long morning news program Buenos Dias Oklahoma and an hour-long newscast each weeknight at 6 p.m. The station was originally scheduled to debut on July 4, 2008, but its sign-on was delayed due to technical issues.

On July 19, 2010, KXAP-LD became an affiliate of Liberman Broadcasting's Spanish-language broadcast network Estrella TV.

Digital channel

On September 1, 2011, KXAP-LD filed an application with the FCC to change its digital channel allocation from UHF channel 51 to channel 38; if granted, the station will use PSIP to display KXAP-LD's virtual channel as "51.1".

References

External links
KXAP-LD official website
Estrella TV official website

XAP-LD
Low-power television stations in the United States
Television channels and stations established in 1999
1999 establishments in Oklahoma
XAP-LD